The 2013–14 DFB-Pokal was the 71st season of the annual German football cup competition. It began on 2 August 2013 with the first of six rounds and ended on 17 May 2014 with the final at the Olympiastadion in Berlin. Bayern Munich went on to win the competition for the second season running, defeating Borussia Dortmund 2–0 in the final.	

The winners would qualify for the group stage of the 2014–15 UEFA Europa League, but as both finalists had already qualified for the 2014–15 UEFA Champions League, the seventh-placed Bundesliga team qualified instead.

Participating clubs
The following 64 teams qualified for the competition:

Schedule
The rounds of the 2013–14 competition are scheduled as follows:

Draw
The draws for the different rounds are conducted as following: For the first round, the participating teams will be split into two pots. The first pot contains all teams which have qualified through their regional cup competitions, the best four teams of the 3rd Liga and the bottom four teams of the Second Bundesliga. Every team from this pot will be drawn to a team from the second pot, which contains all remaining professional teams. The teams from the first pot will be set as the home team in the process.

The two-pot scenario will also be applied for the second round, with the remaining 3rd Liga/amateur teams in the first pot and the remaining professional teams in the other pot. Once one pot is empty, the remaining pairings will be drawn from the other pot with the first-drawn team for a match serving as hosts. For the remaining rounds, the draw will be conducted from just one pot. Any remaining 3rd Liga/amateur team will be the home team if drawn against a professional team. In every other case, the first-drawn team will serve as hosts.
As it is as yet unclear whether MSV Duisburg will retain their license for 2. Bundesliga or not, there will be two hybrid lots bearing the teams of Duisburg and Erzgebirge Aue. Following the final decision that led to Duisburg losing their license, Duisburg was treated as an amateur side.

Matches

First round
The draw took place on 15 June 2013.

Second round
The draw took place on 10 August 2013.

Round of 16
The draw took place on 29 September 2013.

Quarter-finals
The draw took place on 8 December 2013.

Semi-finals
The draw took place on 12 February 2014.

Final

Brackets

References

External links
DFB-Pokal on kicker.de

2013-14
2013–14 in German football cups